Anemosa exanthes is a species of snout moth in the genus Anemosa. It was described by Edward Meyrick in 1885, and is known from Australia.

References

Moths described in 1885
Chrysauginae
Moths of Australia